Carolina Pascual Gracia (born 17 June 1976 in Orihuela, Alicante) is a former Spanish Individual Rhythmic Gymnast. She is the 1992 Olympics silver medalist and the 1993 European all-around bronze medalist.

Career 

Pascual was doing ballet when at age seven her ballet teacher told her mother that her daughter had excellent qualities for Rhythmic Gymnastics. There was not a club in her town so, her mother drove for around an hour to get Pascual to and from training sessions at the Escuela de Competición in Murcia. Pascual later went to the Atlético Montemar in Alicante.

Pascual got her breakthrough in 1990 when Spain's head coach, Emilia Boneva, selected Pascual for the National Team. The newcomer was sent to the 1990 European Championships, where she helped the Spanish team win the bronze medal. She also placed 12th in the all-around and qualified for two event finals.

All the sacrifices that were made paid off when in 1990 Emilia Boneva selected her for the National Team. Pascual was one of Spain's most successful Rhythmic Gymnasts, and the first to get an Olympic medal. At the awards ceremony, bronze medalist Oksana Skaldina refused to acknowledge the podium results. Pascual is one of the few non-Eastern European rhythmic gymnasts to have successful career and medal at the Olympics.

An injured Pascual sat out at the 1992 World Championships, but came back for a bronze All-around medal at 1993 European Cup. But she struggled at the 1993 World Championships and finished 7th in All-around. Still, she would take silver with clubs behind teammate Carmen Acedo. She retired from the sport after the Alicante World Championships in 1993.

As a gymnast she stands out because of her difficult and expressive routines with great back flexibility, and inventive skills.  She is now a coach, at Club IMD in Orihuela.

Notes

References

External links 

 
 
 
 

1976 births
Living people
Spanish rhythmic gymnasts
Olympic gymnasts of Spain
Olympic silver medalists for Spain
Olympic medalists in gymnastics
Medalists at the 1992 Summer Olympics
Gymnasts at the 1992 Summer Olympics
Medalists at the Rhythmic Gymnastics World Championships
20th-century Spanish women
21st-century Spanish women